Jarrad Ross is an Australian professional soccer player who plays for Charlestown City Blues FC.

Career
On 9 January 2008, Ross made his senior debut for the Jets against Adelaide United.

References

External links
 Newcastle Jets profile

1990 births
Australian soccer players
Living people
Newcastle Jets FC players
A-League Men players
National Premier Leagues players
Australian twins
Twin sportspeople
Lake Macquarie City FC players
Association football defenders